is the twenty-third studio album by Japanese heavy metal band Loudness. It was released on May 19, 2010 only in Japan and marks the full-length debut of drummer Masayuki Suzuki. Guitarist Akira Takasaki would later say King of Pain was focused on featuring Suzuki. The album reached number 21 on the Oricon chart.

The album shows a return to standard-tuned guitars and bass, and according to some fans, a return to their 1980s sound.

Track listing
All music written by Akira Takasaki, lyrics as indicated

"Requiem" (instrumental) - 2:59 
"The King of Pain" (Minoru Niihara, Bob Dyer) - 5:30 
"Power of Death" (Niihara, Takashi Kanazawa) - 4:21 
"Death Machine" (Niihara, Kanazawa) - 5:42 
"Doodlebug" (Niihara, Kanazawa) - 5:07
"Rule the World" (Niihara, Kanazawa) - 3:11
"Straight Out of Our Soul" (Niihara, Ken Ayugai) - 3:51
"Where Am I Going?" (Niihara, JJ) - 3:50
"Emma" (Niihara, Kanazawa) - 5:25
"Naraka" (Niihara, Kanazawa) - 3:34
"Doctor from Hell" (Niihara, Ray Higa) - 4:32
"Hell Fire" (Niihara, Bob Dyer) - 4:19
"#666" (Niihara, Kanazawa) - 3:30
"Never Comes" (Niihara, Kanazawa) - 5:02

Personnel
Loudness
Minoru Niihara – vocals
Akira Takasaki – guitar, uncredited vocals on "Where Am I Going?"
Masayoshi Yamashita – bass
Masayuki Suzuki – drums

Production
Masatoshi Sakimoto - engineer, mixing
Yuki Mitome - assistant engineer
Kazuhiro Yamagata - mastering
Kiyomasa Shinoki, Keiichi Oriuchi - executive producers

References

2010 albums
Loudness (band) albums
Japanese-language albums
Tokuma Shoten albums